CD:UK (CountDown:United Kingdom), stylised as cd:uk, is a defunct music television programme which ran in the United Kingdom from 29 August 1998 until 1 April 2006. Originally run in conjunction with SMTV Live, the programme aired on ITV as a rival to the BBC's Live & Kicking and was the replacement for The Chart Show, which had been airing on the network for nine and a half years.

In contrast to its predecessor, which only showed promo videos, CD:UK was broadcast live on Saturday mornings with a studio audience and featured live performances, as well as star interviews and competitions. It also featured the Saturday Chart, which although was unofficial, usually reflected the new chart positions a day before the official chart was announced on Radio 1. This made the BBC's long-running Top of the Pops, which aired only the night before, seem very out-of-date broadcasting the previous week's chart. CD:UK later utilised an interactive chart based on viewers' votes, called the MiTracks Countdown. From 1998 to 2006, the show was sponsored by Tizer, Ribena and Rimmel.

In 2002, the programme was criticised for showing "raunchy" performances in a slot aimed at children, sparked by a performance of "Dirrty" by Christina Aguilera. In response, a spin-off programme entitled CD:UK Hotshots, featuring music videos which could be considered unsuitable for daytime viewing, was launched in January 2003 and broadcast overnight.

History

Presenters

CD:UK was originally fronted by the same presenting team for SMTV Live – Ant & Dec and Cat Deeley. Ant & Dec left both programmes on 1 December 2001 and leaving Deeley as solo presenter.
As time went on, due to her popularity with viewers, Deeley was offered more and more television work and went on to present Stars in Their Eyes and Fame Academy. This meant that she was absent from the show more and more and was frequently replaced by either a celebrity guest or Holly Willoughby from SMTVs successor Ministry of Mayhem. Deeley chose to leave the programme for good in March 2005. TRL presenter Dave Berry presented the programme for several weeks before Holly Willoughby became the new regular host presenting each fortnight with guest presenters such as Kelly Osbourne, Rachel Stevens, Brittany Murphy, Girls Aloud, Natalie Brown and Jayne Middlemiss filling in for the weeks when Willoughby was absent.

MiTracks relaunch
In August 2005, Myleene Klass was hired as main presenter alongside XFM DJ Lauren Laverne and Trouble TV presenter Johny Pitts as part of a major revamp of the programme, which was duly unveiled on 17 September 2005 with new titles, a redesigned studio and a new chart, the MiTracks Countdown, which allowed viewers to vote for their favourite and least favourite songs on the CD:UK website.

Although it was initially reported that the relaunch had helped double viewing figures, audiences soon dropped below 1 million.

Cancellation
On 28 December 2005, it was announced that CD:UK was to cease production due to budget issues within the broadcaster. The final regular edition of the show was aired on Saturday 18 March 2006, followed by two compilation programmes on 25 March and 1 April, respectively.

Aborted revival
On 20 April 2006, it was announced that production company Blaze Television had reached a deal with Five to revive the programme. However, Five announced on 2 June that Klass, Laverne and Pitts would not return to present the show, and that Berry would instead host the show alongside a yet to be decided female presenter, later announced as Caroline Flack. It was also announced that CD:UK would air at 17:30 on Saturday afternoons, and that the show should be back on air, initially by Autumn 2006, later pushed back to some time in 2007. However, nothing on the subject had been heard in several months and it seemed uncertain as to whether the show would return at all. It was officially announced on 17 April 2007 that CD:UK would not be returning.

Music
There have been two compilation albums released between 2 October 2000 and 20 January 2001, featuring many of the bands and singers who have performed on the show. Classic artists include: Westlife, Fatboy Slim, Samantha Mumba, S Club 7, Ronan Keating, Five, Steps, Girls Aloud, A1, Britney Spears, Shanks & Bigfoot and Craig David.

CD:UK – You Know Where it's At!

CD:UK – More Wicked Hits

CD:UK HotshotsCD:UK Hotshots''' was a spin-off programme, aired on the ITV network overnight. Introduced in January 2003, the show was initially presented by Cat Deeley, but she left to make way for MTV presenter Dave Berry who left in the summer of 2005 and was replaced by a rotating presenting team of Myleene Klass, Lauren Laverne and Johny Pitts.

As opposed to the main show, Hotshots consisted of presenters' links and music videos – some of which had been considered unsuitable for broadcast on CD:UK.

International versions
Although the original UK version has ended, an American version of the programme, CD USA, began on DirecTV's The 101 on 21 January 2006. Australian broadcaster Foxtel also air a local version of the show, renamed CD Live, on the Fox8 channel every Saturday evening.

In Italy, the public television channel Rai Due has aired from 2003 to 2007 an Italian version of the show, renamed CD: Live, which replaced Top of the Pops, every Saturday afternoon at 15:00. In Croatia, the public television channel HRT 2 aired a Croatian version of the show, renamed T-Mobile CD Live'', from 2007 to 2008 every Friday afternoon at 18:40.

References

Ant & Dec
1990s British music television series
2000s British music television series
1998 British television series debuts
2006 British television series endings
British music chart television shows
ITV (TV network) original programming
Pop music television series